The 1998 FIA GT A1-Ring 500 km was the eighth round the 1998 FIA GT Championship season.  It took place at the A1-Ring, Austria, on September 20, 1998.

Official results
Class winners are in bold.  Cars failing to complete 70% of winner's distance are marked as Not Classified (NC).

Statistics
 Pole position – #2 AMG Mercedes – 1:22.166
 Fastest lap – #1 AMG Mercedes – 1:23.802
 Average speed – 179.375 km/h

References

 
 
 

A
A1-Ring 500